Wahgunyah Football / Netball Club is an Australian Rules Football club based in North Eastern Victoria that currently competes in the Tallangatta & District Football League.

Club history

The town of Wahgunyah has had an Australian rules football team since 1877 and Wahgunyah's first recorded match was against Corowa (a return match) on Saturday, 16 June 1877, played "on the hill" in Corowa, with Wahgunyah winning the first encounter by three goals to nothing. W Busch was the captain of Wahgunyah FC. Throughout 1877, there was talk of the Wahgunyah and Corowa Football Club's merging to form one stronger club and be called Border United Football Club, with this merger taking place in August, 1877 and their first match as Border United was played against the Rutherglen Football Club in August 1877 and was captained by Jacob Levin. The Border United team wore pink and white colours.

The Wahgunyah Recreation Reserve was set aside by the Victorian Government in 1864 and was controlled by a Government appointed committee of Management.

In 1888, Border United FC fielded three teams, First Twenty, Second Twenty and a junior team that played against other local teams and towns.

Wahgunyah FC (Juniors) was re-established in 1897, with Mr. J Grimmond elected as president and decided that the club colours would be black and white (Magpies) and they decided to play at the racecourse in the Murray Valley Junior Football Association. The club won the 1897 and 1899 Murray Valley Junior Football Association premierships. The Murray Valley Junior Football Association was abandoned in May, 1905.

In 1901, Mr. Hancock won the club's most consistent player award at a club dinner at Wahgunyah's Victoria Hotel.

Border United FC remained in place until 1905, when Corowa and Wahgunyah both entered stand alone teams in the Corowa District Football Association in 1906.

In 1907, Wahgunyah finished on top of the ladder, with eleven wins from twelve games in the Corowa and District Football Association and won the premiership.

Wahgunyah were runners to Howlong in the 1909 Ovens & Murray Junior Football Association grand final. William King won the club's Best all round player award in 1909. Interestingly, in 1896, King was suspended for life by the O&MFA after assaulting an umpire. In 1909, Wahgunyah defeated Corowa to win the local State School premiership.

In 1910, Wahgunyah were runners up to Lake Moodemere in the Ovens & Murray Junior Football Association grand final, after they walked off the ground at three quarter time due to excessively rough play.

Wahgunyah have been involved in two drawn Chiltern & District Football Association senior football grand finals, in 1924 and again in 1954, with Wahgunyah winning both grand finals replays. Details below.

Football competitions timeline

 Ovens & Murray Football League
 1895 - 1905 (Border United FC)
Murray Valley Junior Football Association
1897 - 1904
 Corowa & District Football Association
 1906 and 1907 (Wahgunyah FC)
 Ovens & Murray Football League
1908
 Ovens & Murray Junior Football Association
1909 & 1910
 Rutherglen & District Football Association
1911 & 1912
 Ovens & Murray Football League
 1913 to 1915, (Border United FC)
 Club in recess due to World War One
1916 & 1917
 Rutherglen & Murray Football Association
 1918 (Border United FC)
Chiltern & District Football Association
1919 & 1920
 Ovens & Murray Football League
1921
 Coreen & District Football League
1922
Chiltern & District Football Association
1923 - 1929
 Corowa & District Football Association
1930
Chiltern & District Football Association
1931 - 1937
 Club withdrew from the Chiltern & District Football Association
1938. Wahgunyah FC withdrew from the C&DFA & Corowa Rovers FC entered a team in the C&DFA 1938 & 1939.
 Club in recess due to World War Two
1939 - 1943
 Murray Valley Patriotic Football League
 1944 & 1945 (Border United FC)
 Ovens & Murray Football League
 1946 & 1947 (Border United FC)
 Coreen & District Football League
1948 & 1949
 Chiltern & District Football Association
 1950 - 1956
Coreen & District Football League
1957 - 2007
Tallangatta & District Football League
2008 - 2021

Football Premierships
Juniors
Murray Valley Junior Football Association
1897, 1899.

Seniors
Corowa & District Football Association
1907
Chiltern & District Football Association 
1919, 1924, 1954, 1955
Leeton Football Club – Knockout Competition
 Border United FC
 1946
Coreen & District Football League 
1948, 1949, 1968, 1997, 1998, 2002, 2004.

Reserves
Coreen & District Football League - (1976 to 2007)
1977, 1978, 1984, 1997, 1999, 2002, 2007.

Thirds
Coreen & District Football League - (1980 to 2007)
1987, 1998, 2007.
Tallangatta & District Football League - (2008 to present day)
2012

Fourths
Tallangatta & District Football League - (2008 to present day)
2009, 2010, 2012

Football runners up
Juniors
Murray Valley Junior Football Association
Wahgunyah 
1898, 1900
Corowa & District Football Association
Wahgunyah
1906
Ovens & Murray Junior Football Association
Wahgunyah
1909

Seniors
 Ovens & Murray Football League
Border United 
1900, 1902, 1903, 1904, 1914.
 Chiltern & District Football Association
Wahgunyah
1926
Murray Valley Patriotic Football League
Border United 
1944, 1945
Coreen & District Football League
Wahgunyah
 1978, 1982, 1999

Netball Premierships

A. Grade
Tallangatta & District Football League - (2008 to present day)
2009

B. Grade
Tallangatta & District Football League - (2008 to present day)
2009

C. Grade
Tallangatta & District Football League - (2008 to present day)
 Nil

D. Grade (18 & Under)
Tallangatta & District Football League - (2008 to present day)
 Nil

E. Grade (15 & Under)
Tallangatta & District Football League - (2008 to present day)
 Nil

F. Grade (13 & Under)
Tallangatta & District Football League - (2008 to present day)
 Nil

League Best & Fairest Awards
Senior Football
Coreen & DFL: Archie Denis Medal
 1957, 1961, 1965, 1966 - John Voss. Voss was also runner up in 1962 & 1970. Was runner up in the Chiltern & DFL award in 1954.
 1976 - Len Chandler
 1977, 1981 - Len Johnstone
 1989 - Wayne Milthorpe
 2002 - Scott Parker 

Reserves
Coreen & DFL 
 1984 - T Cope 
 1989 - Mick Upton 
 2005 - Darren Harvey 

Thirds
Coreen & DFL
 1980 - R Eyres
 1988 - Wayne Johnstone 
 1991 - P Roksandic
 1993 - Grant Jolly
 2003 - Scott Brunnemeyer
 2004 & 2005 - Taylor Duryea

VFL / AFL players

The following footballers played with Wahgunyah FNC prior to playing senior VFL / AFL football or were drafted into the AFL. The year indicates their VFL / AFL debut.
1909 - Duncan McIvor - Collingwood
1994 - Damien Houlihan - Collingwood
1997 - Adam Houlihan - Geelong
2000 - Ryan Houlihan - Carlton
2001 - Josh Houlihan - St. Kilda (No. 49 - 2001 AFL Draft. No senior AFL games)
2010 - Taylor Duryea - Hawthorn 

The following VFL / AFL Footballers were born in Wahgunyah, Victoria.
1903 - Gordon Rickards - St. Kilda
1911 - Arthur Francis - Fitzroy
1930 - Bert Mills - Hawthorn
1940 - Shadrach James - Fitzroy

External links
Tallangatta & District FNL
Ovens & Murray Football Netball League
1919 - Chiltern & District Football Association Premiers: Wahgunyah FC team photo
1945 - Border United FC & Tungamah FC team photos
1948 - Coreen & District FL Premiers: Wahgunyah FC team photo
1948 - Bill & Billy Bryant: Wahgunyah FC premiership players
1949 - Coreen & District FL Premiers: Wahgunyah FC team photo
1949 - Coreen & District FL Grand Final: Wahgunyah FC spectators photo
1949 - Wahgunyah FC Premiership Banquet photo
1949 - Coreen & District FL - John Voss: Wahgunyah FC

References

1877 establishments in Australia
Australian rules football clubs established in 1877
Ovens & Murray Football League clubs